Hechtia argentea is a species of flowering plant in the Bromeliaceae family. It is endemic to Mexico.

Cultivars
 Hechtia 'Dorothy'

References

BSI Cultivar Registry Retrieved 11 October 2009

argentea
Endemic flora of Mexico
Taxa named by John Gilbert Baker